Magda Femme (born Magdalena Pokora 22 May 1971) is a Polish pop singer and songwriter.

Magda Femme was born in Łask in 1971. She was a singer in the pop group, Ich Troje, between 1996 and 2000. Magda was married to the leader of the band Michał Wiśniewski, but later they divorced and she started a solo career.

Discography

References 

1971 births
Living people
People from Łask
Eurovision Song Contest entrants of 2006
Eurovision Song Contest entrants for Poland
Polish pop singers
Polish rock singers
21st-century Polish singers
21st-century Polish women singers